Luis de Carvajal may refer to:

Luis de Carvajal (theologian), Spanish Franciscan theologian
Luis de Carvajal (painter) (1531–after 1618), Spanish painter
Luis de Carvajal y de la Cueva (c. 1537–1591), Spanish-Portuguese adventurer, slave-trader and governor